Françoise Babou de La Bourdaisière (1542 – 9 June 1592) was the mistress of Louis de Bérenger du Guast. She married Antoine d'Estrées in 1558, and they were the parents of Gabrielle d'Estrées—mistress of King Henry IV of France.

Life
Françoise Babou was the eldest daughter of Jean Babou de La Bourdaisière and Françoise Robertet. She was described by Gédéon Tallemant des Réaux in his Historiettes as the “most prolific clan of gallant women who ever existed in France.” Francoise received an upbringing at the French royal court—as a fille d'honneur (maid of honour) to Mary Stuart. She remained in this post until Mary’s marriage in 1558, and then served as dame d'honneur to Mary until she left for Scotland. Françoise served in the same position to Queen Louise in 1575-1583. 

Françoise Babou lived with separate rooms from her husband during her years in service at court and had an affair with Louis de Béranger. He was killed in a duel in 1575. 

In 1583 she left the court and her husband permanently to live with her lover Yves d'Alègre on his estates in the Auvergne. In 1589, Yves d'Alègre was appointed governor of Issoire in Auvergne by Henry III. She accompanied him there, and they ruled the city together. With his approval, she introduced sumptuary laws with death penalty. Their rule was highly unpopular, and in 1592, they were both assassinated for political reasons by citizens who broke in to their home. 

She is a subject of the writings by Brantome.

Death 
On 9 June 1592, an angry mob broke into their house—where Yves and Françoise were sleeping—and stabbed Yves in the chest, to which he died. The mob preceded to drag Françoise into a bedroom and stabbed her in the heart. The corpses of Françoise and Yves were then thrown off their balcony and onto the streets of France, where their bodies were stripped and denuded. Their naked bodies were displayed in a public square, in France.

Issue 

 Marie Catherine (1562 – 1565); died in childhood.
 Marguerite (1565 – 7 July 1590); married Gabriel Bournel, Baron de Mouchy.
 Diane (1566 – 1618); married Jean de Monluc in 1596, and became the mistress of Jean-Louis, Duc de d’Epernon.
 Angélique (1570 – 1634); became abbess of Maubuisson. 
 Gabrielle (1571 – 10 April 1599); became mistress of Henry IV of France.
 François Annibal (1573 – 1670); became Maréchal de France.
 Julienne-Hippolyte-Joséphine, Duchess of Villars (1575 – 1680); married George de Brancas and became duchess of Villars.

References

Sources

Further reading
 Jacques-Xavier Carré de Busserolle, Dictionnaire géographique, historique et biographique d'Indre-et-Loire et de l'ancienne province de Touraine, vol. 1, Tours, Éditions de la Société archéologique de Touraine, 1878, 488 p. (lire en ligne [archive]), « Babou », p. 109 à 110.

1542 births
1592 deaths
16th-century French people
Place of birth missing
Violence against women in France
French ladies-in-waiting